This is a list of British Army Yeomanry Regiments converted to Royal Artillery. In the aftermath of the First World War 25 Yeomanry regiments of the British Army were transferred to the Royal Artillery between 1920 and 1922 with another onethe City of London Yeomanry (Rough Riders) reduced to a battery in another regiment. A further seven regiments were converted during the Second World War.

Background
Under threat of invasion by the French Revolutionary government from 1793, and with insufficient military forces to repulse such an attack, the British government under William Pitt the Younger decided in 1794 to increase the Militia and to form corps of volunteers for the defence of the country.  The mounted arm of the volunteers became known as the "Gentlemen and Yeomanry Cavalry".  Despite the end of the Napoleonic Wars in 1815, the Yeomanry was retained by the government "for Military Service in aid of the Civil Power" in the absence of organised police forces.

The Yeomanry was not intended to serve overseas, but due to the string of defeats during Black Week in December 1899, the British government realized they were going to need more troops than just the regular army.  A Royal Warrant was issued on 24 December 1899 to allow volunteer forces to serve in the Second Boer War.  The Royal Warrant asked standing Yeomanry regiments to provide service companies of approximately 115 men each for the Imperial Yeomanry.  In the aftermath of the war, a number of new regiments were formed and Haldane's Reforms resulted in a more effective reserve force for home defence.  By the outbreak of the First World War, there were 55 regiments.

In accordance with the Territorial and Reserve Forces Act 1907 (7 Edw. 7, c.9) which brought the Territorial Force into being, the TF was intended to be a home defence force for service during wartime and members could not be compelled to serve outside the country. However, on the outbreak of war on 4 August 1914, many members volunteered for Imperial Service.  Therefore, TF units were split in August and September 1914 into 1st Line (liable for overseas service) and 2nd Line (home service for those unable or unwilling to serve overseas) units.  Later, a 3rd Line was formed to act as a reserve, providing trained replacements for the 1st and 2nd Line regiments.

The experience of the First World War made it clear that cavalry was surfeit.  Indeed, by the end of the war, just 17 1st Line regiments remained as mounted cavalry; the rest had been converted to infantry or machine gun battalions.  Almost all 2nd Line regiments were converted to cyclists in 1916 and 1917, and the 3rd Line regiments were absorbed into reserve cavalry regiments or reserve infantry battalions.

Post war, a commission was set up to consider the shape of the Territorial Force (Territorial Army from 1 October 1921).  Only the 14 most senior regiments were retained as cavalry (though the Lovat Scouts and the Scottish Horse were also to remain mounted as "scouts").  Eight regiments were converted to Armoured Car Companies of the Royal Tank Corps (RTC), one was reduced to a battery in another regiment, one was absorbed into a local infantry battalion, one became a signals regiment and two were disbanded.  The remaining 25 regiments were converted to brigades of the Royal Field Artillery between 1920 and 1922.

Regiments

See also

 List of Yeomanry Regiments 1908
 Yeomanry
 Yeomanry order of precedence

Notes

References

Bibliography
 
 
 

 
Royal Artillery
 
Units and formations of the Royal Artillery
Yeomanry
Yeomanry Regiments converted to Royal Artillery